The GP Internacional Paredes Rota dos Móveis is a road bicycle racing stage race held annually in the Portugal. Since 2006, it has been organised as a 2.1 event on the UCI Europe Tour.

Winners

External links
Official website 

Cycle races in Portugal
UCI Europe Tour races
Recurring sporting events established in 2006
2006 establishments in Portugal
Spring (season) events in Portugal